Ahmed Ebrahim Mubarak Isa Al Khattal (born 6 October 1988) is a Bahraini footballer currently playing with Al Hala of Bahrain and the Bahrain national football team.

References

External links
 

1988 births
Living people
Bahraini footballers
Bahrain international footballers
Bahraini Premier League players
Al Hala SC players
Qalali Club players
Association football forwards